Englynion Gwydion is the name sometimes used to refer to a series of three englyn (Welsh plural englynion) composed by Gwydion to call to him the wounded Lleu Llaw Gyffes. It appears in the fourth branch of the Mabinogi, the tale of Math fab Mathonwy.

References 

Welsh mythology